Hahi, is a town in Oodweyne District located in western Togdheer, Somaliland.

History
Hahi started as a permanent well for pastoralists and became a settlement. In the 19th century, members of the Sufi order Dandarawiyah would establish a tariqa and jama'a (congregation) at the town. The order was founded by Sayid Mohamed al Dandarawi who was a student of Ibrahim al Rashid and their teachings spread from Arabia to Sudan before eventually reaching Somaliland via the Somali Sheikh Sayid Aadan Ahmed. It would spread to Sheikh although it remained much smaller than the established Qadiriyya or Salihiyya orders. A young Nur Ahmed would study in the tariqa of Hahi before a succession crisis would prompt him to leave and eventually see him take the title of Habr Yunis Sultan.

Demographics
Hahi is inhabited by subclans of the Habar Yunis, a subdivision of the Garhajis clan of the wider Isaaq clan family.

References

Populated places in Togdheer